Peace Valley is a valley in the northwestern corner of Los Angeles County, California, running northeast−southeast along the San Andreas Fault and a section of Interstate 5 near Tejon Pass. The unincorporated community of Gorman is located within the valley.

Geography
The valley is located between the foothills of the Tehachapi Mountains to the north, the San Emigdio Mountains to the west, and the Sierra Pelona to the southeast. Hungry Valley State Vehicle Recreation Area is located to the southwest and meets the valley at the north end of Coyote Canyon.

Ecology

The valley is located at ecological transition zone between the semi-arid montane chaparral of the Transverse Ranges and the desert plant communities of the nearby Antelope Valley.

Transportation
Interstate 5 as it approaches Tejon Pass from the south passes through the entire length of the valley. The I-5 intersection with California State Route 138 is in its eastern section.

See also
Mountain Communities of the Tejon Pass
Cuddy Canyon
Hungry Valley

References

External links

Valleys of Los Angeles County, California
Mountain Communities of the Tejon Pass
San Emigdio Mountains
Tehachapi Mountains
Valleys of California